Antoine Devaux (born 21 February 1985) is a French football midfielder.

Career
Born in Dieppe, Devaux began his career at Le Havre. In 2007, he joined Ligue 2 side FC Gueugnon, where he stayed just one season, before moving to US Boulogne. In 2009 Devaux left US Boulogne to sign a three-year deal with FC Toulouse.

External links
 Profile on Eurosport 
 

Living people
1985 births
Association football defenders
French footballers
Ligue 1 players
Ligue 2 players
US Boulogne players
Le Havre AC players
FC Gueugnon players
Toulouse FC players
Stade de Reims players
Tours FC players